Temljine is a settlement in the Municipality of Tolmin in the Littoral region of Slovenia.

References

External links
Temljine at Geopedia

Populated places in the Municipality of Tolmin